Whitener Creek is a stream in western Bollinger and southeastern Madison counties in the U.S. state of Missouri.  It is a tributary of the Castor River.

Whitener Creek has the name of Henry Whitener, a pioneer settler.

See also
List of rivers of Missouri

References

Rivers of Bollinger County, Missouri
Rivers of Madison County, Missouri
Rivers of Missouri